The Pennsylvania Department of Conservation and Natural  Resources (DCNR), established on July 1, 1995, is the agency in the U.S. State of Pennsylvania responsible for maintaining and preserving the state's 124 state parks and 20 state forests; providing information on the state's natural resources; and working with communities to benefit local recreation and natural areas. The agency has its headquarters in the Rachel Carson State Office Building in Harrisburg.

The department was formed when then-governor Tom Ridge split the Department of Environmental Resources (DER) into the DCNR and Department of Environmental Protection (DEP).

History

Current Secretary of Conservation and Natural Resources
 Cindy Adams Dunn (Appointed January 2015)

Past Secretaries of Conservation and Natural Resources
 Ellen Ferretti (Appointed September 2013)
 John Quigley (Appointed April 2009)
 Michael D. DiBerardinis (Appointed January 2003)
 John C. Oliver (Appointed November 1995)

Education
The DCNR is host to many different environmental education programs throughout the summer months. These range from topics such as "Leave No Trace" hiking/camping policy to the different wildlife and plant species of many of the state parks.

Law enforcement

Pennsylvania DCNR rangers act much like National Park Rangers do. They routinely check on cabins and campsites, offer insightful answers to visitors questions, and help to maintain calmness throughout the parks.  They have full arrest powers while in park lands and carry side arms.  However, they do not have jurisdiction over Pennsylvania State Game Lands, which are patrolled by Wildlife Conservation Officers employed by the Pennsylvania Game Commission.  DCNR rangers enforce game laws as well as fishing and boating laws in state parks. However, the Pennsylvania Fish and Boat Commission is completely independent of the Pennsylvania Game Commission.  Both agencies are independent of DCNR, but work in cooperation with each other.

DCNR ranger responsibilities have three primary elements:

 Public contact - Assisting visitors to make the outdoor experience safe, educational and enjoyable.
 First responder - DCNR "forest" rangers are trained and certified Department of Health medical first responders capable of providing basic life support in an emergency. Some DCNR rangers have continued their education and training to be certified as emergency medical technicians.
 Law enforcement - Rangers act as law enforcement officers the same way as typical police officers would, but also enforce game, fishing, and boating laws.

Organizational structure
The DCNR comprises the following subunits:
 Deputy Secretary for Parks and Forestry
 Bureau of State Parks
 Bureau of Forestry
 Deputy Secretary for Conservation and Technical Services
 Nathan Flood
 Bureau of Geological Survey
 Bureau of Recreation and Conservation
 Bureau of Facility Design and Construction
 Wild Resource Conservation Program
 Deputy Secretary for Administration
 Brian Grove
 Bureau of Human Resources
 Bureau of Administrative Services
 Bureau of Information Technology
 Office of Policy and Planning
 Office of Education, Communications and Partnerships
 Office of Conservation Science
 Pennsylvania Natural Heritage Program
 Chief Counsel
 Richard Morrison

See also

 List of Pennsylvania state agencies
 Natural Lands
 List of law enforcement agencies in Pennsylvania

References

External links
 Pennsylvania Department of Conservation and Natural Resources

Conservation and Natural Resources
Government agencies established in 1995
State environmental protection agencies of the United States
Natural resources agencies in the United States
1995 establishments in Pennsylvania